UBQ Materials is an Israeli cleantech company created to convert unsorted household waste into a thermoplastic composite. The company's primary product, UBQ, is a thermoplastic, sold in the form of pellets, that can be used to substitute for wood, concrete, or oil based plastics in the manufacturing of durable products. In 2018, UBQ Materials Ltd. became a Certified B Corporation.

History

Funding 
UBQ Materials was founded in 2012 by Yehuda Pearl (co-founder of Sabra), Jack (Tato) Bigio, and Eran Lev. The Company developed patents for the conversion of unsorted municipal waste, including all organics, into a thermoplastic material. The patented UBQ product and manufacturing process was developed between 2012 and 2017. Albert Douer, owner of multinational petrochemical, construction, and packaging manufacturer, joined the company in 2013 as a senior strategic investor and later as chairman of the board. In 2018, UBQ began commercial production. UBQ has offices located in Tel Aviv, Israel, and a manufacturing plant in Kibbutz Tze'elim in the Negev area of southern Israel.

Financing 
As of 2019, UBQ has raised $42.5 million from private investors, Battery Ventures and EASME.

Technology
Waste is received, either as residual solid waste diverted from landfills or as RDF, already dried and shredded. The waste runs through stages of automatic refinement, removing particles of metals and minerals that are sent to recycling facilities. At this stage it is cleared as feedstock for the reactor; physical processes set off a chemical reaction in the waste, breaking down the organic elements to their basic particulate components; lignin, sugar, cellulose, and fibers. These components are reconstituted into a homogenous matrix with the melted plastics to create UBQ.

The resulting material is sold as standardized pellets to be used in conventional manufacturing machinery to create products with a reduced environmental footprint.

Application
UBQ material is used in injection, compression molding, extrusion and 3D printing, and is compatible with PP, PE, PLA, and PVC. The concentration of UBQ within the final material compound is dependent on the physical property requirements of the product application. It may be compounded with additives to modify coloration, impact strength, and UV resistance.

In November 2019, UBQ Materials entered into a collaboration with fast-food chain McDonald's franchisee Arcos Dorados to develop serving trays made with UBQ.

In January 2020, German automotive manufacturer Mercedes-Benz announced it will test UBQ products in its vehicles, for production of the passenger cabin and outer plastic parts.

UBQ is utilized as a sustainability additive in retail products, furniture, and within the material supply chain.

Environmental impact
Each ton of UBQ material diverts 1.3 tons of landfill-destined waste and prevents up to 11.7 tons of CO2 equivalent. Environmental impact calculations are derived from ISO 14040/44 compliant life cycle assessment of the UBQ material produced in Tse’elim, Israel. The patented conversion process uses ¼ the energy of conventional plastic manufacturing, requires no water, and produces no effluents or sludge.

UBQ is a bio-preferred USDA certified material, recyclable, and composed entirely of recycled materials.

References

Companies of Israel
2012 establishments in Israel
Plastic recycling